Ángel Segundo Médici (20 December 1897 – 9 August 1971) was an Argentine association football defender who represented the Argentina national football team on 34 occasions between 1922 and 1928.

Playing career

Médici started his career playing for San Telmo and then moved to Club Atlético Atlanta. In 1922 he joined Boca Juniors and made his first appearance for the Argentina national team. During his time with the club, Boca Juniors won four league titles and a number of minor cup competitions.

Médici appeared in five Copa América squads for Argentina between 1922 and 1926. He was part of the winning team in 1925.

In 1928 he was a member of the Argentine team which won the silver medal in the 1928 Olympic football tournament.

Club titles

International title

Managerial career
Médici went on to become a football manager, working as the coach of Barracas Central amongst others.

References

1897 births
1971 deaths
Footballers from Buenos Aires
Argentine footballers
Club Atlético Atlanta footballers
Boca Juniors footballers
Argentine Primera División players
Footballers at the 1928 Summer Olympics
Olympic footballers of Argentina
Olympic silver medalists for Argentina
Argentina international footballers
Argentine football managers
Olympic medalists in football
Burials at La Chacarita Cemetery
Medalists at the 1928 Summer Olympics
Association football defenders